Ingunn Thomassen Berg is a Norwegian handball player. She played over 120 matches for the Norway women's national handball team from 1979 to 1985.  She participated at the 1982 World Women's Handball Championship, where the Norwegian team placed seventh.

References

Year of birth missing (living people)
Living people
Norwegian female handball players